Sarat Ubaida Governorate (Arabic: محافظة سراة عبيدة), located in the southwestern part of Saudi Arabia, is one of twelve governorates of the 'Asir Region of that country.

Location
Sarat Ubaida, an affiliated Saudi province of Asir Emirate, is located on the Khamis Mushayt international road in southwestern Saudi Arabia.

History
The area has a 2,000-year history. The name comes from Sarat, meaning "geographical location", and Obeida from Queen Obeida, the wife of the King of Yemen. Sarat Obeida has been a trading station and has become a center of markets and a breeding ground for caravans. The Almsaferah line passes through the region.

Climate
The climate of Sarat Ubaida varies. It experiences mild to cold winters. The region is characterized by the Tihama Qahtan wind, which is hot in the summer and moderate in the winter. The region is mountainous and sometimes experiences fog on the slopes at Altdarisi.

References

'Asir Province
Governorates of Saudi Arabia